The Florida Velodrome Association, or FVA, is a non-profit organization founded in 2010 by a group of cyclists. The organization is dedicated to promoting awareness of the Brian Piccolo Park Velodrome. It helps to develop track cycling by running a consistent racing program for all ages. FVA is also responsible for hosting competitive events at the velodrome at Brian Piccolo Park.

FVA is mainly funded by training session fees, race fees, and private donations. Local bicycle shops and other local businesses also help sponsor race events conducted by FVA.

Sponsors 
The two current sponsors of the FVA are BMC and FPL. As of May 8th, 2022, FVA has also agreed to sponsor Alpha Cycling.

External Links 

 Official website

References 

Non-profit organizations based in Florida